Cullen in Banffshire was a royal burgh that returned one commissioner to the Parliament of Scotland and to the Convention of Estates.

The Parliament of Scotland ceased to exist with the Act of Union 1707, and the commissioner for Cullen, Patrick Ogilvy, was one of those co-opted to represent Scotland in the first Parliament of Great Britain. From the 1708 general election Banff, Cullen, Elgin, Inverurie and Kintore comprised the Elgin district of burghs, electing one Member of Parliament between them.

List of burgh commissioners

 1661: George Dunbar 
 1663: George Leslie 
1665 convention, 1667 convention: not represented
 1669–72: __ Baird  
 1678 convention, 1685–86: George Leslie, bailie 
 1681–82, 1689 convention, 1689–1695: Sir James Ogilvie of that Ilk (took public office 1696)
 1696–1702: Sir John Hamilton of Hallcraig 
 1702-1707: Patrick Ogilvy

See also
 List of constituencies in the Parliament of Scotland at the time of the Union

References

Burghs represented in the Parliament of Scotland (to 1707)
Constituencies disestablished in 1707
History of Moray
Politics of the county of Banff
1707 disestablishments in Scotland